Robert Arno, from the ITT Exelis Advanced Information Systems of Rome, NY, was named Fellow of the Institute of Electrical and Electronics Engineers (IEEE) in 2014 "for contributions in applying stochastic modeling techniques to power distribution systems for critical facilities."

References

Fellow Members of the IEEE
Living people
Year of birth missing (living people)
Place of birth missing (living people)
American electrical engineers